Jani Honkavaara (born 2 February 1976) is a Finnish football manager and retired football player, who most lately was the manager of his hometown side SJK.

Career
Honkavaara began his football career in TP-Seinäjoki (formerly known as Törnävän Pallo-55). During his time in the club, he played 10 matches in Finnish top tier Veikkausliiga. Later in his career he was mainly known for playing for East Helsinki based club FC Viikingit of Vuosaari.

Managerial career
After retiring as a football player, Honkavaara was first appointed to the role of reserve team head coach in FC Viikingit. In 2007, he was appointed to coaching team and held position of coach in the club till 2009. In autumn 2009 he was selected as head coach of HIFK where he led the club towards promotion to Finnish first division Ykkönen after season 2010. He resigned from the role of manager of HIFK after season 2011. After the successful spell at HIFK, he went to coach another Helsinki based club IF Gnistan. Despite rather successful season, he then resigned from the club after season 2012, citing to family reasons. Soon after he was appointed as the new head coach of HIFK which had faced relegation back to Finnish second division, Kakkonen, after the ending season, led by Honkavaara's successor in the managerial role, Juha Moilanen. Right after next and very successful season 2013, he led HIFK back to Ykkönen. After the 2014 season, HIFK was promoted to Veikkausliiga, making it to the top tier of Finnish football for the first time in over 40 years.

At the end of November 2016 it was announced, that Honkavaara would be the new manager of KuPS, starting from 1 January 2017. In the 2019 Veikkausliiga season, Honkavaara led KuPS to its first Finnish championship in 43 years.

In October 2019 Honkavaara was announced as the new manager of his hometown side SJK.

References

Living people
1976 births
Finnish football managers
HIFK Fotboll managers
Veikkausliiga players
JIPPO players
FC Viikingit players
FC Kontu players
Association football midfielders
Finnish footballers
TP-Seinäjoki players
Kuopion Palloseura managers
People from Seinäjoki
Sportspeople from South Ostrobothnia